The following highways are numbered 516:

Canada
  Ontario Highway 516

United States
  Interstate 516
  New Mexico State Road 516
  Pennsylvania Route 516

Territories
  Puerto Rico Highway 516